Griggs Field at James S. Malosky Stadium located on the campus of the University of Minnesota Duluth in Duluth, Minnesota is the home stadium, since 1966, of the UMD Bulldogs football team and of the UMD women's soccer since 1994. The facility was originally known as Griggs Field, after Richard L. Griggs, a philanthropist whose many business interests included a long time era as President and CEO  of Northern National Bank/Duluth National Bank and was active in the founding of Jefferson Lines.  He was also a regent for the University of Minnesota.  Its current name was adopted in 2008 to honor long time football coach Jim Malosky.

In addition to housing the football, women's soccer and track teams, the 4,000-seat Griggs Field also hosts a number of high school football and track and field events throughout the year as well as UMD's intramural activities.

References

External links
umdbulldogs.com page

College football venues
Sports venues in Minnesota
Buildings and structures in Duluth, Minnesota
Soccer venues in Minnesota
1966 establishments in Minnesota
Sports venues completed in 1966
College soccer venues in the United States
College track and field venues in the United States
American football venues in Minnesota
Athletics (track and field) venues in Minnesota